Lancelot Press was a Canadian publishing company which operated between 1966 and 1997. It specialized in non-fiction titles, many of which were of a regional nature centered on Maritime Canada, in the fields of local history, spirituality and personal memoirs. For many years, Lancelot was one of the very few Maritime publishing companies.

The business was founded by Reverend William Pope (1923-2010), a United Church minister, near Hantsport, Nova Scotia. Responsibilities for its operation were shared with his wife Isabel. Between its founding and wrapping up, it published more than 500 titles. Many well-known writers in the region published with Lancelot, including Douglas How, Bridglal Pachai, Alden Nowlan and Dorothy Perkyns. The poet Margaret Avison published several titles with Lancelot including No Time (1989) which won the Governor General's Award for Poetry.

Many Lancelot Press titles remain in print through a publishing arrangement with Nimbus.


Robert Pope Foundation
The Popes wrapped up Lancelot Press in 1997 to focus on a new enterprise, the Robert Pope Foundation. Named for their late son and artist Robert Pope, who died of Hodgkins Lymphoma, the foundation shares his legacy of art which conveyed the artist's impressions of illness and healing from a patient's point of view. His work was published in the book Illness and Healing: Images of Cancer, which is today presented by the Robert Pope Foundation to first-year medical students across Canada. Pope's Illness and Healing was the recipient of the Richardson Award in 1992. In 2012, Pope's work was the subject of a retrospective exhibition at the Art Gallery of Nova Scotia.

Selected writers and works published

References

External links
 ISBN database: Lancelot Press

Book publishing companies of Canada
Defunct publishing companies of Canada
Companies based in Nova Scotia
Publishing companies established in 1966
Small press publishing companies
1966 establishments in Nova Scotia
Companies disestablished in 1997
1997 establishments in Nova Scotia